"Football Crazy" is an episode of the British comedy television series The Goodies.

This episode was made by LWT for ITV.

Written by The Goodies, with songs and music by Bill Oddie.

Plot
Football fans have become increasingly violent, and Bill, who is the worst offender, is arrested for disruptive behaviour by Tim (who has become a police officer).  It is not Bill's first offence at the football and he proudly stands by during a listing of his previous misdemeanours as a spectator.

Tim is of the opinion that the players are also to blame for the violence by the length of their shorts, and by their provocative on-field behaviour after scoring goals.

To cut down on the violence, it is decided that the shorts should be longer, and that only one fan be allowed to watch each game as a spectator in attendance — with a large number of police to keep the fan in check.  Bill is the fan who is chosen to attend, and, being the only fan, he becomes increasingly violent and frustrated during the match because he has nobody to fight with.

Later, as a last resort against football violence, the sport is no longer played.  However, although football no longer exists, the violence remains, and it finds a new outlet.

Tim decides to attend the ballet at Covent Garden.  While walking to the theatre, he is worried about the number of violent-looking young men, dressed as sports fans, who are heading in the same direction.  Tim is looking forward to seeing the ballet — but he is not impressed to discover that the violent-looking men are also members of the audience.

As the ballet starts, so, too, do the spectators, who are cheering or booing the dancers on the stage.  Football spectator violence had become ballet spectator violence — and violent competition between football teams had now transferred to violent competition between the ballerinas and the male ballet dancers.  The Goodies get caught up with what is happening on stage — Tim becomes a 'trainer', and both Graeme and Bill take part in the dance 'competition', where, dressed as ballerinas with football socks, they dance in opposition to the male ballet dancers. They dance against Aston Villa with their own team being Bill, Graeme, Kevin Keegan, Pelé, Johan Cruyff and Tim as manager.

Cultural references
Classical music was subject to heckling during premieres, often degenerating into riots. The premiere of The Rite of Spring became particularly infamous for this.

Notes
This was also the final episode to be filmed, as evidenced by Bill Oddie's shorter haircut and slightly longer

DVD and VHS releases

This episode has been released on both DVD and VHS.

References

 "The Complete Goodies" — Robert Ross, B T Batsford, London, 2000
 "The Goodies Rule OK" — Robert Ross, Carlton Books Ltd, Sydney, 2006
 "From Fringe to Flying Circus — 'Celebrating a Unique Generation of Comedy 1960-1980'" — Roger Wilmut, Eyre Methuen Ltd, 1980
 "The Goodies Episode Summaries" — Brett Allender
 "The Goodies — Fact File" — Matthew K. Sharp

External links
 

The Goodies (series 9) episodes
1982 British television episodes